The Darkest Cloud is the debut studio album by Chicago rapper Vakill, released May 5, 2003 on Molemen Records []. The album came eight long years after the rapper's 1995 debut EP Who's Afraid? []. The album drew acclaim from underground fans and critics alike, due to its dark production and advanced lyricism . The Darkest Cloud features production from members of The Molemen, and guest appearances from Slug (of Atmosphere), Copywrite, Camu Tao, Breez Evahflowin and Jakki Da Motamouth . The album's lead single is "End of Days" b/w "Sickplicity" b/w "The Creed" .

Track listing

Album singles

References

2003 debut albums
Vakill albums